"" is a song by Lithuanian singer and songwriter Monika Liu. It represented  at the Eurovision Song Contest 2022 in Turin, Italy, after winning the competition  2022. It marks the first time since  that Lithuania has sent a song fully performed in Lithuanian and the first since  in a domestic language. The single reached number one in Lithuania. The song has been described as sounding ''French''. 

"Sentimentai" was placed into the first semi-final of Eurovision 2022 on 10 May 2022 and qualified for the grand final, which took place on 14 May 2022. At the grand final, Lithuania took 14th place with a total of 128 points.

Charts

References 

2022 singles
2022 songs
Eurovision songs of 2022
Eurovision songs of Lithuania